Cestrum parqui, commonly known as palqui, green cestrum or willow-leaved jessamine, is a species of flowering plant native to Chile. In Australia the plant is regarded as a noxious invasive weed and a significant hazard to livestock (especially cattle) which may eat it inadvertently or during shortages of other foods, often resulting in death.

In cultivation in the United Kingdom this plant has gained the Royal Horticultural Society’s Award of Garden Merit. (confirmed 2017).

Description
C. parqui is a fast-growing, straggling, woody, semi-evergreen shrub that grows over 3 metres tall (or more in warmer areas) with one or a few fragile green stems. The alternate, light green leaves have an unpleasant rubber-like smell when crushed. It produces terminal sprays of small, pungent-scented, tubular yellow-green flowers 2.5 cm long from spring to autumn, followed by bunches of small, black, egg-shaped berries produced from summer to autumn. All parts of the plant are reported to be highly toxic.

Reproduction
The small, black fruits of Cestrum parqui are highly attractive to birds, which play a major role in seed-dispersal, passing the seeds in their droppings: seedlings are thus often found growing under perching trees, along fencelines, and in creek banks, where it is also dispersed by water.

Because of its easy dispersal and being a garden escape, it is considered to be a noxious weed in Australia, where it is even prohibited for merchandising in New South Wales.

Uses

Medicinal
The plant contains toxic alkaloids. It has been used in folk medicine to treat tumours and haemorrhoids and possesses sudorific (= perspiration-inducing), laxative and antispasmodic properties. Decoctions or infusions of the plant have also been administered in cases of intermittent fever and an infusion of the inner bark drunk to treat unspecified "stomach ailments". A poultice prepared from the plant (part unspecified) in combination with Solanum nigrum (part unspecified) and the crushed stems of Vitis vinifera, the grape vine, is believed in folk medicine to have anti-inflammatory properties. A crude  extract of its aerial parts in methanol water displayed inhibition of carrageenin-induced oedema.

Tobacco substitute
Carl Hartwich - in his monumental work on recreational drugs of 1911 Die Menschlichen Genussmittel... (trans. 'The Pleasure Drugs of Humankind...'), - records the following:

On the island of Chiloe, when there is a lack of tobacco, the Cholos Indians replace it with another Solanacea Palguin or Palquin, which they apparently smoked before the first [i.e. tobacco derived from various Nicotiana species] became known. The plant, Cestrum parqui  L'Her. , a small tree with lanceolate leaves and yellowish-white flowers, appears to be widespread in South America, it is found throughout Chile and the southern states of Brazil. In Chile they say of a well-known person: 'He is as famous as Palqui '. The leaves (which are toxic to cattle) and the wood are used medicinally. I was able to detect a trace of alkaloid in the latter. [translated from the original German]

Ritualistic
Branches of Cestrum parqui are used to slap patients during shamanic healing ceremonies utilising the hallucinogenic plant Latua pubiflora held by the indigenous Huilliche people of the Los Lagos Region of southern Chile. This is done in the belief that the foul smell of the Cestrum leaves is abhorrent to the demons believed to be causing the patient's illness and will cause them to leave the patient's body in vomit.

Gallery

See also
List of plants poisonous to equines

References

External links
 Weed Identification
 Cestrum parqui

parqui
Flora of Chile
Garden plants of South America
Invasive plant species in Australia
Plants described in 1788